Deportivo San José is a Paraguayan basketball club based in Asunción. They play in the Paraguayan Metropolitan Basketball League, the premier basketball league in the country. San José has won the Metropolitan League twelve times, its last title being the Clausura 2022. San José trails only Olimpia in league titles, as the team has won a record 32.

History 
The club was founded for students of the Colegio San José. In 1965, San José won its first title when they won the Paraguayan 6th-level league. In 1966, they entered the main league and never left the top flight again. In 1968, a basketball court was opened.

Honours 
Paraguayan Metropolitan Basketball League

 Champions (12): 1991, 1993, 1997, 2000, 2001, 2002, 2003, 2004, 2016, 2018 C, 2019 C, 2021, 2022 A, 2022 C

References 

Basketball teams in Paraguay